World Military Basketball Championship is a championship annually held in the beginning of summer between men and women serving in the military from around the world.

2009

Preliminary round
The 2009 championship was held in Klaipėda, Lithuania. Ten nations participated in this event in Taikos 61 Sports Center in Klaipėda, Lithuania. The arrival of the teams occurred on June 6, 2009. The nations were divided into two groups of five. In the preliminary round, nations would battle each other once for a total of 4 games. Then, the top two teams would qualify to the finals (1st-4th place), and the next two teams would qualify to relegation round (5th-8th place). Teams will depart on June 15, 2009.

Group A

Group B

Finals

5th - 8th place

Standings
  Greece
  Lithuania
  United States
  Kazakhstan
  Germany
  China
  Latvia
  Italy
  South Korea
  Cyprus

Source: Delfi News.

See also
International Military Sports Council
Military World Games

External links
 WMBC Main Page

Basketball